Kim Seong-jae (born September 17, 1976) is a South Korean retired football player and coach.

Club career 
He played for FC Seoul (formerly the Anyang LG Cheetahs), Gyeongnam FC, and Chunnam Dragons.

Managerial career 
In January 2010, he was appointed as a reserve team coach of FC Seoul. In January 2010, he was appointed as an assistant manager of FC Seoul.

Honours

Player
Anyang LG Cheetahs
 K-League Winner (1): 2000
 K-League Runner-up (1): 2001

References

External links
 

1976 births
Living people
K League 1 players
FC Seoul players
FC Seoul non-playing staff
FC Seoul managers
Gyeongnam FC players
Jeonnam Dragons players
South Korean footballers
Hanyang University alumni
Association football midfielders
South Korea under-23 international footballers
South Korean football managers